Eye of the Cat is a 1975 Italian comedy film written and directed by Alberto Bevilacqua.

Cast
Nino Manfredi as Marcello Ferrari
 Mariangela Melato as Giulia
 Eli Wallach as Cesare (voice of Sergio Fiorentini)
 Enzo Cannavale as Lolo
 Francisco Rabal as the priest (voice of Luciano De Ambrosis)
 Mario Scaccia as Salomone 
 Adriana Innocenti as Jolanda
 Franco Scandurra as The Butler (voice of Giorgio Piazza)
 Ettore Manni as Cesare's friend
 Erika Blanc as Margot
 Cristina Gaioni as a prostitute
 Loredana Bertè as a prostitute

Plot

Ras (Eli Wallach) is a ruler or dictator who covets another man's wife (Mariangela Melato) as his own. He gets what he wants, but Ras wants more: in this case, to humiliate Marcello (Nino Manfredi), a dedicated musician whose life he has already ruined by leaving his cat and taking his wife. He forces Marcello to seek an annulment to his marriage through the Vatican. Ras gets everything, but Marcello's wife, Giulia, and Marcello have other ideas.

Awards
David di Donatello 1976 - Best Screenplay

References

Further reading
 Alberto Bevilacqua. Attenti al buffone: il racconto del film, saggi, altri racconti tematici. Garzanti, 1975.

External links

Italian comedy-drama films
1975 comedy-drama films
1975 films
Films directed by Alberto Bevilacqua
Films scored by Ennio Morricone
1970s Italian films
1970s Italian-language films